Flapper Wives is a 1924 American silent drama film directed by Justin H. McCloskey and Jane Murfin and starring May Allison, Rockliffe Fellowes, and Vera Reynolds.

Cast
 May Allison as Claudia Bigelow 
 Rockliffe Fellowes as Stephen Carey 
 Vera Reynolds as Sadie Callahan 
 Edward Everett Horton as Vincent Platt 
 Harry Mestayer as Charles Bigelow 
 William V. Mong as Enoch Metcalf 
 Eddie Phillips as Tony 
 Tom O'Brien as Tim Callahan 
 Evelyn Selbie as Hulda 
 Robert Dudley as Lem 
 Stanley Goethals as Jimsy 
 J.C. Fowler as Dr. Oliver Lee

Preservation
With no copies of Flapper Wives located in any film archives, it is a lost film.

References

Bibliography
 Rainey, Buck. Sweethearts of the Sage: Biographies and Filmographies of 258 Actresses Appearing in Western Movies. McFarland & Company, 1992.

External links

1924 films
1924 drama films
1920s English-language films
American silent feature films
Silent American drama films
American black-and-white films
Films directed by Justin H. McCloskey
Films directed by Jane Murfin
Selznick Pictures films
1920s American films